Calcutta North West Lok Sabha constituency was one of the 543 parliamentary constituencies in India. The constituency centred on the north-western part of Calcutta in West Bengal. As a consequence of the order of the Delimitation Commission in respect of the delimitation of constituencies in the West Bengal, this parliamentary constituency ceased to exist from 2009.

Assembly segments
In 2004, Calcutta North West Lok Sabha constituency was composed of the following assembly segments:
 Cossipur (assembly constituency no. 140)
 Shyampukur (assembly constituency no. 141)
 Jorabagan (assembly constituency no. 142)
 Jorasanko (assembly constituency no. 143)
 Bara Bazar (assembly constituency no. 144)
 Bowbazar (assembly constituency no. 145)
 Taltola (SC) (assembly constituency no. 154)

Members of Lok Sabha (Parliament)

For MPs from northern parts of Kolkata in subsequent years see Kolkata Uttar Lok Sabha constituency

Election results

General election 2004

General election 1999

General election 1998

General election 1996

General election 1991

General election 1989

General election 1984

General election 1980

General election 1977

General election 1971

General election 1967

General election 1962

General election 1957

General election 1952

General elections 1951-2004
Most of the contests were multi-cornered. However, only winners and runners-up are mentioned below:

See also
Kolkata
List of Constituencies of the Lok Sabha

References

Former Lok Sabha constituencies of West Bengal
Former constituencies of the Lok Sabha
Politics of Kolkata district
2008 disestablishments in India
Constituencies disestablished in 2008